Dash Akol 
() is a 1971 Iranian drama film directed by Masoud Kimiai. It was adopted from a short story of the same name written by Sadegh Hedayat in his short story collection Three Drops of Blood.

Plot

Cast
 Behrouz Vossoughi as Dash Akol
 Mary Apick as Marjan
 Bahman Mofid as Kaka Rostam
 Jahangir Forouhar as Dash Akol's friend
 Manuchehr Ahmadi as Chelingar
 Mansoor Matin as Haj Samad
 Ebrahim Naderi as Kaka Rostam's friend
 Jalal Pishvaian as Kaka Rostam's friend
 Shahrzad 
 Zhaleh Olov
 Kan'an Kiani

References

External links
 

1971 films
Films directed by Masoud Kimiai
1970s Persian-language films
1971 drama films
Films based on works by Sadegh Hedayat
Films about children
1970s coming-of-age drama films
Films about child sexual abuse
Iranian drama films